Mojack is an instrumental rock band, formed by ex-Black Flag guitarist Greg Ginn. The music of Mojack is similar to another one of Ginn's instrumental projects, Gone, however, it is much more jazz-oriented. Besides Ginn on guitar, the band includes ex-member of Bazooka Tony Atherton playing saxophone and clarinet, Steve Sharp on bass guitar, Andy Batwinas on percussion, and Richie West on drums.

Discography
 Merchandising Murder (1995)
 Home Brew (1997)
 Rub-a-Dub (2003, unreleased)
 Under The Willow Tree (2007)
 The Metal Years (2008)
 Hijinks (2011)
 Car (2013)

External links 
Mojack website

American jazz ensembles from California
Punk rock groups from California
Musical groups from Los Angeles
Musical groups established in 1995
SST Records artists
Jazz musicians from California